Highlights from The Main Event is an Australian live album released in 1998, which consists of performances from the collaborative The Main Event Tour by John Farnham, Olivia Newton-John, and Anthony Warlow. The album peaked at No. 1 on the ARIA Albums Chart for two weeks in December that year. It was re-released in 2001 with three additional tracks.

Track listing 
 "Overture" feat. Olivia Newton-John, John Farnham, Anthony Warlow
 "Age of Reason" feat. Olivia Newton-John, John Farnham, Anthony Warlow
 "Phantom of the Opera" feat. Olivia Newton-John, John Farnham, Anthony Warlow
 "Little More Love" feat. Olivia Newton-John, John Farnham, Anthony Warlow
 "Age of Reason" feat. Olivia Newton-John, John Farnham, Anthony Warlow
 "This Is the Moment" feat Anthony Warlow
 "Hopelessly Devoted to You" feat. Olivia Newton-John
 "Every Time You Cry" feat. John Farnham
 "Please Don't Ask Me" feat. Olivia Newton-John, John Farnham
 "You're the One That I Want" feat. Olivia Newton-John, John Farnham
 "Long and Winding Road" feat. Olivia Newton-John, Anthony Warlow
 "Take Me Home, Country Roads" feat. Olivia Newton-John, Anthony Warlow
 "I Honestly Love You" feat. Olivia Newton-John, Anthony Warlow
 "Love Is a Gift" feat. Olivia Newton-John, Anthony Warlow
 "That's Life/Bad Habits" feat. John Farnham, Anthony Warlow
 "Granada" feat. John Farnham, Anthony Warlow
 "You've Lost That Lovin' Feelin'" feat. Olivia Newton-John, John Farnham, Anthony Warlow
 "Summer Nights" feat. Olivia Newton-John, John Farnham, Anthony Warlow
 "If Not for You" feat. Olivia Newton-John, John Farnham, Anthony Warlow
 "Let Me Be There" feat. Olivia Newton-John, John Farnham, Anthony Warlow
 "Raindrops Keep Falling on My Head" feat. Olivia Newton-John, John Farnham, Anthony Warlow
 "Jolene" feat. Olivia Newton-John, John Farnham, Anthony Warlow
 "Heart's on Fire" feat. Olivia Newton-John, John Farnham, Anthony Warlow
 "Don't You Know It's Magic" feat. Olivia Newton-John, John Farnham, Anthony Warlow
 "You're the Voice" feat. Olivia Newton-John, John Farnham, Anthony Warlow
 "Two Strong Hearts" (2001 reissue bonus track) feat. Olivia Newton-John, John Farnham
 "Not Gonna Give in to It" (2001 reissue bonus track) feat. Olivia Newton-John, Anthony Warlow
 "Help!" (2001 reissue bonus track) feat. John Farnham, Anthony Warlow

Charts

Weekly charts

Year-end charts

Certifications

References

1998 live albums
ARIA Award-winning albums
John Farnham live albums
Olivia Newton-John live albums
Collaborative albums